Kyalami (or Kyalami Grand Prix Circuit) is a racetrack in Midrand, Gauteng, South Africa.

Kyalami can also refer to:
Kyalami Agricultural Holdings, a suburb in Johannesburg, South Africa
Kyalami Estates, Gauteng, a gated suburb in Johannesburg, South Africa
Kyalami Business Park, Gauteng, a gated suburb in Johannesburg, South Africa
Kyalami Castle, a castle in South Africa, owned by the Church of Scientology
Maserati Kyalami, an Italian sports car.